A technician is a worker proficient in the skills of a field of technology. It can also refer to a person who is an expert in the practical or technical aspects of a science or art.

Technician may also refer to:

 Technician (horse) (foaled 2016), an Irish Thoroughbred racehorse
 Technician (newspaper), the student newspaper of North Carolina State University
 Technician (United States Army), a U.S. Army enlisted rank 1942–1948
 The Technician (novel), a 2011 novel by Neal Asher
 The Technicians, a 1980s Australian pop group

See also